The Benz Patent-Motorwagen ("patent motorcar"), built in 1885 by the German Carl Benz, is widely regarded as the world's first practical modern automobile and was the first car put into series production. It was patented and unveiled in 1886. The original cost of the vehicle in 1886 was 600 imperial German marks, approximately 150 US dollars.

Karl's wife Bertha demonstrated its feasibility in a trip from Mannheim to Pforzheim in August 1888, shortly before it became the first commercially available automobile in history in the late summer of 1888.

Due to the creation of the Patent-Motorwagen, Benz has been hailed as the father and inventor of the automobile.

Development and specifications

After developing a successful gasoline-powered two-stroke piston engine in 1873, Benz focused on developing a motorized vehicle while maintaining a career as a designer and manufacturer of stationary engines and their associated parts.

The Benz Patent-Motorwagen was a motor tricycle with a rear-mounted engine. The vehicle contained many new inventions. It was constructed of steel tubing with woodwork panels. The steel-spoked wheels and solid rubber tires were Benz's own design. Steering was by way of a toothed rack that pivoted the unsprung front wheel. Fully elliptic springs were used at the back along with a beam axle and chain drive on both sides. A simple belt system served as a single-speed transmission, varying torque between an open disc and drive disc.

The first Motorwagen used the Benz  single-cylinder four-stroke engine with trembler coil ignition. Although its open crankcase and drip oiling system would be alien to a modern mechanic, its use of a pushrod-operated poppet valve for exhaust would be quite familiar. A large horizontal flywheel stabilized the single-cylinder engine's power output. An evaporative carburettor was controlled by a sleeve valve to regulate power and engine speed. The first model of the Motorwagen had not been built with a carburettor, rather a basin of fuel soaked fibers that supplied fuel to the cylinder by evaporation.

The vehicle was awarded the German patent number 37435, for which Karl Benz applied on 29 January 1886. Following official procedures, the date of the application became the patent date for the invention once the patent was granted, which occurred in November of that year. Benz unveiled his invention to the public on 3 July 1886, on the Ringstrasse in Mannheim.

The chassis was improved in 1887 with the introduction of wooden-spoke wheels, a fuel tank, and a manual leather shoe brake on the rear wheels.

About 25 Patent-Motorwagen were built between 1886 and 1893.

Bertha Benz's trip

Bertha Benz, Karl's wife, whose dowry financed the development of the Patent-Motorwagen, was aware of the need for publicity. She took the Patent-Motorwagen No. 3 and drove it on the first long-distance internal combustion automobile road trip to demonstrate its feasibility. That trip occurred in early August 1888, when she took her sons Eugen and Richard, fifteen and fourteen years old, respectively, on a ride from Mannheim through Heidelberg, and Wiesloch, to her maternal hometown of Pforzheim.

 In Germany, a parade of antique automobiles celebrates this historic trip of Bertha Benz every two years. On February 25, 2008, the Bertha Benz Memorial Route, following the route of Benz's journey, was officially approved as a Tourist or Scenic Route by the German authorities as a route of industrial heritage of mankind. The  of signposted route leads from Mannheim via Heidelberg to Pforzheim (Black Forest) and back.

In media

The car can be driven in the video game Gran Turismo 4 and Android video game Driving Legends: The Car Story. It was also driven by Sherlock Holmes's sister Enola in the film Enola Holmes.

See also
History of the automobile
Benz Velo (later 4 wheel model)
List of Mercedes-Benz vehicles (incl. summary of Benz vehicles)
List of motorcycles of the 1890s
List of motorized trikes
Three-wheeler

Early developments essential to the development of automobiles
Nicolas Léonard Sadi Carnot, physics of the internal combustion engine
Illuminating gas, first internal combustion engine fuel
Ligroin or heavy naphtha, first liquid automotive fuel, n-hexane

Car and car engine designers, chronologically by first vehicle/engine built
Nicolas-Joseph Cugnot (1725–1804), French inventor of the world's first automobile, a 1769–1770 steam-fuelled vehicle
Étienne Lenoir, developer of the first atmospheric gaseous fueled internal combustion engine and automobile (1860–1863), pioneer of electroplating
Nicolaus Otto, developer of the first successful compressed charge gaseous fueled internal combustion engine (1860s–70s)
Siegfried Marcus, developed petrol-powered, internal combustion engine vehicles (1864? 1870? 1888)
Wilhelm Maybach, designed engines starting in the 1870s–80s; first motorbike (1885), second internal combustion car (1889)
Gottlieb Daimler, German engineer, pioneer of internal-combustion engines and automobile development (1870s and on)

Notes

References

External links

 Patent 37435, by Karl Benz for his 1885 Motorwagon The birth certificate of the automobile - the German patent application of January 29, 1886, that was granted on November 2, 1886 to Benz & Company in Mannheim
 Automuseum Dr. Carl Benz, Ladenburg (Heidelberg)
 John H. Lienhard on Bertha Benz's ride

Patent-Motorwagen
First car made by manufacturer
Three-wheeled motor vehicles
1880s cars
1890s cars
German inventions
Vehicles introduced in 1886
Cars introduced in 1886
1886 in Germany